Joseph Bert Heathcock (5 December 1903–1990) was an English footballer who played in the Football League for Leicester City and Nottingham Forest.

References

1903 births
1990 deaths
English footballers
Association football forwards
English Football League players
Cradley Heath F.C. players
Leamington F.C. players
Leicester City F.C. players
Nottingham Forest F.C. players
Hereford United F.C. players
Nuneaton Borough F.C. players